Elachistocleis piauiensis is a species of frog in the family Microhylidae.
It is endemic to Brazil.
Its natural habitats are dry savanna, moist savanna, subtropical or tropical dry shrubland, subtropical or tropical dry lowland grassland, intermittent freshwater marshes, arable land, pastureland, rural gardens, and ponds.
It is threatened by habitat loss.

References

piauiensis
Endemic fauna of Brazil
Amphibians of Brazil
Taxonomy articles created by Polbot
Amphibians described in 1983
Taxa named by Ulisses Caramaschi